Dulal Chandra Goswami is an Indian politician. He was elected to the Lok Sabha, lower house of the Parliament of India from Katihar in the 2019 Indian general election as member of the Janata Dal (United).

See also
 List of members of the 17th Lok Sabha

References

India MPs 2019–present
Lok Sabha members from Bihar
Living people
Janata Dal (United) politicians
People from Katihar
1967 births